Amherst is a former intercity rail station located in Amherst, Massachusetts. The station was built by the Amherst and Belchertown Railroad in 1853; it was served by the Central Vermont Railway until 1947. Amtrak service began in 1989 with the Montrealer; it was replaced by the Vermonter in 1995.  The station was closed on December 28, 2014, when the Vermonter was rerouted to the faster Connecticut River Line to the west.

History

The station was built in 1853 by the Amherst and Belchertown Railroad - the only brick station on the line. Service began in May 1853 under lease to the New London, Willimantic and Palmer Railroad (NLW&P). Amherst was the northern terminus of the line until 1867, when the New London Northern Railroad (NLN) - which had taken over the bankrupt companies - completed an extension to Millers Falls on the Vermont and Massachusetts Railroad. The line became part of the Vermont Central Railroad in 1871, which was taken over in 1873 by the Central Vermont Railroad (after 1899, the Central Vermont Railway [CV]). The Central Massachusetts Railroad, which paralleled the NLN south of Amherst, had its own station - which is also still extant - located on South Pleasant Street.

Passenger service on the CV south of the Vermont state line ended on September 27, 1947; the station was modified for other uses. On July 18, 1989, the Amtrak Montrealer (which had been discontinued in 1987 due to poor track conditions on the Connecticut River Line in Massachusetts and the CV in Vermont) was restored on a new routing via Amherst, with a stop there. The building, which is privately owned, was restored to its original condition in 1992. The interior was split between a passenger waiting area and a commercial space. On April 1, 1995, the Montrealer was cut back to St. Albans, Vermont and renamed as the Vermonter.

In 2014, the Connecticut River Line was rebuilt for renewed passenger service. The last day of service to Amherst was December 28.

References

Further reading

External links

Amherst station - USA Rail Guide

Former Amtrak stations in Massachusetts
Buildings and structures in Amherst, Massachusetts
Former Central Vermont Railway stations
Railway stations in Hampshire County, Massachusetts
1853 establishments in Massachusetts
Railway stations in the United States opened in 1853
Railway stations closed in 1947
Railway stations in the United States opened in 1989
Railway stations closed in 2014